Truro is the county town of Cornwall. 

Truro may also refer to:

Places
Truro, South Australia
Truro, Nova Scotia, Canada
Truro (UK Parliament constituency), Cornwall, England

United States
Truro, Illinois
Truro Township, Knox County, Illinois
Truro, Iowa
Truro, Massachusetts
Truro Township, Franklin County, Ohio
Truro Parish, Virginia
Truro Church (Fairfax, Virginia)

Transportation
HMCS Truro, a Royal Canadian Navy minesweeper
Truro (ship), a ship that carried the first batch of indentured Indian labourers to South Africa
HMS Truro (1919), British Royal Navy minesweeper
GWR 3700 Class 3440 City of Truro, a Great Western Railway 4-4-0 steam locomotive, is claimed to be the first locomotive to have exceeded 100 MPH
Truro, a West Cornwall Railway locomotive

Other uses
Baron Truro, a title in the Peerage of the United Kingdom
Thomas Wilde, 3rd Baron Truro (1856–1899), English first-class cricketer and barrister
Thomas Wilde, 1st Baron Truro (1783–1855), English jurist and Lord Chancellor
Truro murders, a series of murders in South Australia named after the town near where the remains of the victims were dumped
 A fictional Florida town in the 1980s TV series Flamingo Road

See also
Truro station (disambiguation)